Five ships and a training establishment of the Royal Navy have borne the name HMS Eaglet:

  was an 8-gun ketch built in 1655 and sold in 1674.
  was a 10-gun ketch launched in 1691 and captured in 1693 by the French off the Isle of Arran.
  was a paddle vessel, hired between 1855 and 1857.
  was launched in 1804 as Eagle and renamed whilst a training ship in 1918. She was destroyed by fire in 1926 and the wreck was sold in 1927.
  was a  sloop launched as Sir Bevis in 1918, renamed Irwell in 1923 and Eaglet in 1926. She was broken up in 1971.
  was founded in 1904 and moved onshore after the scrapping of the last named ship in 1971.

See also
  - for similarly named ships of the Royal Navy.

Royal Navy ship names